The Singles Collection is a compilation album by The Specials.

Track listing

Track 10 presents only the first half of the "Stereotype/Stereotype Pt. 2" single from More Specials.
Tracks 14 through 16 were originally recorded under the "Special AKA" name, which the band used following the split of the original lineup in 1981.
Some pressings of the album are missing track 16.

Tracks listing for 'Singles' release

This 1991 pressing replaces "Maggie's Farm" and "Rude Boys Outta Jail"  with "International Jet Set" and "War Crimes".

References

1991 greatest hits albums
The Specials compilation albums
Chrysalis Records compilation albums
2 Tone Records albums